Lalu Prasad Yadav (born 11 June 1948) is an Indian politician and president of the Rashtriya Janata Dal (RJD). He is a former Chief Minister of Bihar (1990-1997), a former Railway Minister of India (2004-2009), and a former Member of Parliament (MP) of the Lok Sabha.

He entered politics at Patna University as a student leader and in 1977 at the age of 29, was elected as the youngest member of the Lok Sabha for the Janata Party. He became the Chief Minister of Bihar in 1990. His party came to power in 2015 Bihar Legislative Assembly election in partnership with Nitish Kumar of JD(U). This coalition ended when Nitish resigned and RJD was ousted, becoming the opposition party. In 2020 Bihar Legislative Assembly election, RJD remained the single largest party in Bihar, and along with JDU is in power, currently heading the government. Lalu Yadav was convicted in the controversial Fodder Scam, and was serving a term until 17 April 2021, when he was granted bail from the High Court.

Early life & Education
Lalu Prasad, second of his parents six sons, was born in Phulwariya village (on Gopalganj-Kushinagar highway NH-27) in Gopalganj district of Bihar to Kundan Ray and Marachhiya Devi, and attended a local middle school before moving to Patna with his elder brother.

After completing Bachelor of Laws and a M.A. in Political Science from B. N. College of Patna University, he worked as clerk in Bihar Veterinary College at Patna where his elder brother was also a peon. Lalu Prasad belongs to Yadav agricultural caste. He turned down Patna University's Honorary Doctorate in 2004.

Personal life & Family

Lalu Prasad Yadav married Rabri Devi on 1 June 1973, in an arranged marriage, and they went on to have two sons and seven daughters.

 elder son: Tej Pratap Yadav 
 younger son: Tejashwi Yadav 
 eldest daughter: Misa Bharti 
 2nd daughter: Rohini Acharya Yadav
 3rd daughter: Chanda Yadav 
 4th daughter: Ragini Yadav - married to Rahul Yadav, Samajwadi Party leader
 5th daughter: Hema Yadav
 6th daughter: Anushka Yadav (Dhannu) - married to Chiranjeev Rao
 youngest daughter: Raj Lakshmi Yadav - married to Tej Pratap Singh Yadav

Note: Rahul Yadav is son of Jitendra Yadav, former MLC from the Samajwadi Party. Jitendra is the nephew of former MP D. P. Yadav.

Political career

1970–1990: Student Leader and Youngest MP

In 1970, Lalu entered in student politics as the general secretary of the Patna University Students' Union (PUSU), became its president in 1973, joined Jai Prakash Narayan' Bihar Movement in 1974 where he became sufficiently close to Janata Party (JP) leaders to become the Janta alliance's winning candidate in the 1977 Lok Sabha election from Chapra at the age of 29. In 1979, the Janata Party government fell due to in-fighting. The parliament was dissolved with new polls held in 1980. Lalu quit Janta party to join the splinter group, Janta Party-S led by Raj Narain, only to lose the re-election in 1980. He managed to win Bihar Legislative Assembly election later in 1980, and again in 1985 to become leader of opposition in Bihar assembly in 1989. Later in 1989, he was also elected for Lok Sabha under V. P. Singh government. By 1990, he positioned himself as the leader of Yadav (11.7% of the Bihar's) and lower castes. Muslims, who had traditionally served as Congress (I) vote bank, shifted their support to Prasad after the 1989 Bhagalpur violence. He became popular among the young voters of Bihar.

1990–1997: Lalu Yadav as Chief Minister of Bihar
In 1990, Janata Dal came to power in Bihar. PM V. P. Singh wanted former chief minister Ram Sundar Das to lead the government. and Chandra Shekhar backed Raghunath Jha. To break deadlock deputy PM Devi Lal nominated Prasad as CM candidate. He was victorious in an internal poll of Janta Dal MLA's and became the chief minister. On 23 September 1990, Prasad arrested L. K. Advani at Samastipur during the latter's Ram Rath Yatra to Ayodhya, which establish himself as a secular leader among the people of Bihar. The World Bank lauded his party for its work in the 1990s on the economic front. In 1993, Prasad adopted a pro-English policy and pushed for the re-introduction of English as a language in school curriculum, contrary to the angrezi hatao (banish English) policy of then Uttar Pradesh CM Mulayam Singh Yadav. Policy of opposition to English was considered an anti-elite policy since both the Yadav leaders represented the same social constituents – the backward castes, dalits and minority communities. With the mass support of people of Bihar, Lalu continued to be Bihar CM.

1997–2000: Formation of RJD and National Politics 

In 1997, due to allegation related to Fodder Scam, a leadership revolt surfaced in Janta Dal, consequently Lalu broke away from Janta Dal and formed a new political party Rashtriya Janata Dal (RJD). In 1998 general for 12th Lok Sabha Lalu won from Madhepura, but lost in 1999 general election to Sharad Yadav. In 2000 Bihar Legislative Assembly election he won and remained in opposition.

2000–2005:Rabri Devi as Chief Ministers of Bihar
In 2002, Lalu was elected in Rajya Sabha where he stayed until 2004. In 2002, RJD formed the government with Rabri Devi as the CM. Except for brief President rule and 7 days term of Nitish Kumar, RJD remained in power in Bihar until 2005.

2004–2009: Union Minister of Railway 
In May 2004, Lalu Yadav contested general election from Chhapra and Madhepura against Rajiv Pratap Rudy and Sharad Yadav respectively and won from both the seats with a huge margin with the great support and faith of people of Bihar. In total, RJD won 21 seats and it allied with Indian National Congress becoming second-largest member of UPA I after Congress. Lalu Yadav became the Railway Minister in the 2004 UPA Government. Later, he gave up the Madhepura seat.

As railway minister, Lalu Yadav left passenger fares untouched and focused on other sources of revenue for the railways. He banned plastic cups from being used to serve tea at railway stations and replaced those with kulhars (earthen cups), in order to generate more employment in rural areas. Later, he also said that he had plans to introduce buttermilk and khādī. In June 2004, he announced that he would get on the railway himself to inspect its problems and went on to board the train from Patna Railway station at midnight.

When he took over, the Indian Railways was a loss-making organisation. Business schools around the world became interested in Lalu Yadav's leadership in managing the turnaround. The turnaround was introduced as a case study by the Indian Institute of Management. Yadav also received invitations from eight Ivy League schools for lectures, and addressed over a hundred students from Harvard, Wharton and others in Hindi. In 2006, the Harvard Business School and HEC Management School, France, have shown interest in turning Lalu Yadav's experiment with the Indian Railway into case studies for aspiring business graduates.

In 2009, Yadav's successor Mamata Banerjee and the opposition parties alleged that the so-called turnaround of the Railways during his tenure was merely a result of presenting financial statements differently. A 2011 report by the Comptroller and Auditor General (CAG) endorsed this view. CAG found that the "surplus" shown on the financial statements during Yadav's tenure covered "cash and investible surplus", which were not included in the "net surplus" figures released by the Railways in the earlier years. The "cash surplus" included the money available for paying dividend, contribution to the Depreciation Reserve Fund used for renewal or replacement of existing assets, and other funds for investment. The "investible surplus" included the money allocated for capital expenditure. The report concluded that the performance of the Railways actually declined marginally during the last few years of Lalu's tenure.

2005–2015: Out of power in Bihar and Center
Bihar Assembly elections were held twice in the year 2005. There was a fractured verdict in February 2005 Assembly Election. Since no government could be formed in Bihar, fresh elections were held in October–November the same year. In November 2005 state elections RJD won 54 seats, less than both Janata Dal United (JDU) and the Bharatiya Janata Party (BJP). Nitish Kumar led coalition, consisting of JD(U) and BJP, came to power. In the 2010 elections, the RJD tally was reduced to just 22 seats whereas the ruling alliance claimed a record 206 out of the 243 Assembly seats. In 2009 general election RJD won 4 seats and provided outside support to Manmohan Singh government.
In May 2012, Lalu Prasad Yadav envisaged Hamid Ansari, previous vice-president, as a presidential candidate. In May 2013, Lalu Yadav tried to rejuvenate the party and fuel the party workers in his Parivartan Rally. After the conviction in Fodder Scam on 3 October 2013, Yadav was disqualified from the membership of Lok Sabha. In 2014 general election, Lalu Yadav's RJD again won 4 seats.

2015–current: Grand Alliance 
In the 2015 Bihar Legislative Assembly election, Lalu Yadav's RJD became the largest party with a total of 81 seats. He along with his partner Nitish Kumar of JD(U) had the absolute majority to form a government in Bihar. This was cited as a major comeback for the RJD and for Lalu Yadav on the political stage of Bihar after a gap of 10 years. But that suffocating alliance did not last long as Nitish Kumar dumped and ousted Lalu's party from the power and alliance in July 2017 after the Enforcement Directorate and Central Bureau of Investigation lodged several criminal cases against Lalu's son and Deputy Chief Minister, Tejashwi Yadav.

Positions held 
Lalu Prasad Yadav has been elected 4 times as MLA and 5 times as Lok Sabha MP.

Note: 
 2004: Re-elected to the 14th Lok Sabha (4th term) from Chapra and Madhepura; retained Chapra. Appointed Cabinet Minister in the Ministry of Railways in UPA govt. Lalu, wife Rabri Devi, son Tejashwi Yadav and daughter Misa Bharti booked for railway tender bribery scam, disproportionate illegal property and income tax evasion cases in 2017.
 2009: Re-elected to the 15th Lok Sabha (5th term). Contested two seats. Lost from Pataliputra but won from Saran, and disqualified in 2013 subsequent to his conviction in the first fodder scam case. And barred from contesting elections for 6 years.

Populist policies and consolidation of lower castes

According to Seyed Hossein Zarhani, although Laloo Prasad became a hate figure among Forward Castes, he drew huge support from backward castes and Dalits. He was criticised for neglecting development, but a study conducted during his reign, among downtrodden Musahars revealed that despite the construction of houses for them not being concluded at required pace, they are obliged to choose him as their leader as he  returned them their ijjat (honour)
and for the first time they are allowed to vote as per their own wishes. A number of populist policies which directly impacted his "Backward Caste" supporters were launched during his tenure. Some of these being establishment of Charvaha schools, where children of poor could get skilled; abolishment of cess on toddy and making of the negligence of rules related to reservation for "Backward Castes" as cognizable offence. Yadav mobilised 'Backwards' through his identity politics. According to his conception, Forward Castes were elite in the outlook and thus he portrayed himself as, "Messiah of Backwards" by ensuring that his way of living remain identical to his supporters who were mostly poor. He even continued to reside in his quarter of one room after getting elected as Chief Minister, though later he moved to official residence of the CM for administrative convenience.

Another significant event during his regime was the recruitment of 'Backward Castes' and communities to government services in large numbers. The government's white paper claimed to have significant number of vacancies in health sector and similar manpower crunch existed across various sectors. The rules of recruitment were changed drastically in order to benefit "Backward Castes", who supported him. The frequent transfer of existing officers, who were at the higher echelon of bureaucracy was also an important feature of Yadav and Rabri Devi's regime. These developments led to collapse of administration and entire system. Yadav however continued to rule Bihar due to massive support from "Backward Castes" as well as his emphasis on "honour" which he considered more important than the development. Thus according to Zarhani, for the lower caste he was a charismatic leader who was capable to become the voice of those who were silent for long.

Another form of mobilisation of his Dalit supporters by Laloo Yadav was popularising all those folk heroes of lower castes, who were said to have vanquished the upper caste adversaries. One such example is of a popular Dalit saint who was revered as he not only ran away with an upper caste girl but also suppressed all her kins. Praising him could enrage Bhumihar caste in some parts of Bihar. There is a grand celebration every year at a particular place near Patna and Yadav participates in this fair with pomp and show. His energetic participation in this show makes it a rallying point for Dalits, who saw it as their victory and the harassment of upper castes.

According to Kalyani Shankar, Yadav created a feeling amongst the oppressed that they are real rulers of state under him. He continuously lambasted the oppressors on the behalf of the oppressed and led to their emergence as the pivot of political power. The upper caste, who composed just 13.2% of the population, were controlling most of the land while the 'Backwards', who were 51%, own very little land. The advent of Lalu led to a drastic change in the economic profile of the state, followed by the diversification of the occupation of the 'Backwards' and increase in land owned by them.

Yadav also instilled a sense of confidence among Muslims by stopping Lal Krishna Advani's controversial "Rath yatra". Muslims of Bihar were feeling a sense of insecurity after the ghastly 1989 Bhagalpur riots. The Satyendra Narayan Singh government failed to control law and order situation thus death toll reached over 1000. The people affected were mostly poor weavers and others belonging to low strata of society and hence they were looking for a leader who could control the deteriorating situation of state under Congress. According to Kalyani, during this period upper castes were totally marginalised and 'Backwards' came to control the power firmly.

Emergence as the leader of plebeians
During his tenure, Yadav never tried to emulate the erstwhile elite chief ministers. He took part in the public festivals and popularised his famous Kurta far Holi (cloth tearing holi). On this occasion his invitees and the media persons would reach his house shouting: Kaha Chhupal hai Lalu Sala (Where is the bloody Lalu hiding ?). Yadav also responded in a similar abusive tone. The vulgar songs were also played on the occasion. Besides this, he never hesitated in calling himself as a son of poor Goala (herder). During his public celebration of Holi festival, he used to play the Dhol himself and dance on the beat of Jogira song. Yadav's rallies were called railla, a symbol of masculinity. Those participating in these rallies were supposed to carry a lathi, a robust stick, which was both the symbol of "masculinity" as well as the chief weapon of a "herder", who used it to manage his cows. The drinking of Bhang, a natural liquor and sitting the whole night to watch the Launda dance (Dance of a Eunuch acting as a woman) made him popular among rural Biharis but all of these obscene activities of a Chief Minister irritated the middle class sensibilities.
According to Ashwini Kumar:

Confrontation with bureaucracy and other policies

With the coming in power of Yadav, the representation of OBC saw a spurt in the legislative assembly of state. The upper-caste were at great disadvantage due to the new caste composition of the state legislature. In his second tenure, when the elections of 1995 took place in the state, the  OBC legislators became 49.69 per cent in the assembly and the upper caste legislators fell to 17.28 per cent, a massive decline since 1960s. The domination of the Backwards in the legislature brought it into conflict with the bureaucracy, which was still dominated by the upper-castes. There  witnessed  a hike in incidents of  corruption, because the upper-caste bureaucrats utilised the 'lack of knowledge' in administration of the new legislators (from the OBC background) to stealthily sabotage and subvert constructive policies of the Yadav's government.

Since, the administrative class belonged to landed class of upper caste; the Thakur, Bhumihar, Kayastha and Brahmin, they aimed at this obstruction, in order to secure not only their personal interest, but also the interest of the social class, they belonged to. The advent of Yadav to power was considered as end of their dominance. Hence, amidst confrontation between the bureaucracy and the legislature, the upper-caste dominated bureaucracy  became determined to obstruct the caste based social justice promoted by the Janata Dal government under Yadav. They often resorted to frequent defiance of orders to maintain the status-quo. Hence, the government undermined the bureaucracy, as the government, which is said to have voted to power on the platform of OBC empowerment, was also determined to bring the social justice, even at the cost of administrative disfunction.

At the time, the caste composition of judiciary also mirrored the bureaucracy and latter too come into conflict with the government. In the meantime, in the year 1996, a major scandal was witnessed in the state, which involved embezzlement of billions of rupees from the Animal Husbandry Department of state. Initially, the case was to be investigated by Bihar police, which means, government to be in the control of the investigation, but later the judiciary came into play, and the reservation of the case by Supreme Court for Central Bureau of Investigation, saw Patna High Court assuming charge over the case. The Fodder Scam, as it was called was a new series of conflict between the government on one hand and the CBI and Judiciary at the other hand.

Between 1990 and 2005, the government under Yadav's Janata Dal undertook several measures to strengthen the control of OBCs, Scheduled Caste and Muslims over bureaucracy. Latter were given the powerful position like those of District Magistrate. Transfers of the upper echelon of bureaucracy was also frequently resorted to. In the year 1993, the post of Director General of Police as well as Chief Secretary were both given to officers belonging to lower castes and the incumbent officers, who were both Brahmins were removed. Since the strategy of transfer of unwanted bureaucrats has a limit, Yadav's government was adamant in use of quota to fill these posts with the officials from the subaltern background. If unable to appoint the lower castes, the government chose to keep many posts vacant, to prevent the upper castes from occupying them.

In order to weaken the upper-caste bureaucracy, the scope for intervention in its functioning by the party officials, belonging to Janata Dal was kept open.Hence, increased interference by party activists in the functioning of bureaucracy and police was witnessed. Meanwhile, the resurgence of the OBCs and SCs also resulted in extension of patronage to many of the Bahubalis ( a term representing someone with money and muscle power with criminal background) from these social groups. Yadav is said to have patronised;  Pappu Yadav, operating out of Purnea and Madhepura districts; Vinod Yadav, operating out of Bhagalpur district; Surendra Yadav, operating out of Gaya district; Mohammad Shahabuddin, operating out of Siwan district; Makhi Paswan, operating out of Khagaria district; and Mohammed Suleiman, operating out of Kishanganj district.

A popular opinion outside Bihar with respect to weakening of bureaucracy and "breakdown of governance" was the presence of rampant corruption and leadership's ineptitude in  Yadav's regime. But, according to Jeffrey Witsoe, the RJD deliberately weakened the state institutions controlled by upper-castes in order to empower the lower castes. The OBCs were in control of government but the media and the bureaucracy along with the judiciary was still in control of upper-castes, it was this upper-caste dominance of the other state institutions that the OBC leadership was vying to end by trying to displace the upper-castes effectively from power.

In the meantime, accusations were laid against Yadav's government for fomenting caste based antagonism between various social groups. Various commentators have stressed that under Yadav's Janata Dal rule, the agricultural labourers and untouchables became vocal for respect from the dominant class and the fair wages. Retaliation on the part of lower castes were also seen, when the dominant caste militias tried to quell their revolt on these grounds. In one such case, in December 1991, a dominant caste militia called "Savarna Liberation Front" gangraped and murdered ten Dalit women, in retaliation, the left wing militants all belonging either Dalit or Backward Castes killed thirty five people from the dominant caste. William Dalrymple has chronicled the account of a dominant caste landowner who survived the massacre. The interlocutor of Dalrymple, who declared the incident to be a handiwork of Bihar government under Yadav said:

Another account from the Sargana Gram Panchayat area testifies the change in established socio-political order brought by the government under Yadav. A large Rajput farmer from the Panchayat constituency, who had been a predecessor of the incumbent Mukhiya of the village said:

As per one opinion, Yadav extended tacit support to the Maoist Communist Centre of India (MCC), and in the period of caste wars, he, as a Chief Minister frequently visited the places, where the victims were from Backward Castes. It is opined that many people from these castes voted him, only because he represented their aspiration of speaking back and becoming virile. The poor of the state couldn't gain much in terms of jobs and services of state, but they were no longer left to be treated with disdain. Nandini Gooptu has mentioned some studies from the rural Bihar, belonging to the time period following the coming into power of Yadav, where the Schedule Castes like Musahars became vocal for their rights including wages, for the work they do under 'employment guarantee schemes' of government. In one such study, a Musahar woman was recorded  abusing the government officials belonging to Rajput caste for cheating [them] on wages due to them. Similarly, in another case, a Schedule Tribe Santhal was recorded taunting son of a Kayastha landlord. Many changes were observed at the lowest level of governance too; in one such case, a Rajput landlord family was replaced by a Kevat caste man for the post of Mukhiya in a village. These changes in the rural Bihar was found to be remarkable, considering the brutally enforced inequalities persisting therein for years.

In the early years of his rise in political circle, Yadav was also successful in creating defection in the left-wing political parties of the state, which had long history of association with Naxalism. In the areas around Nalanda and Aurangabad, the weakening of the CPI-ML liberation is attributed to the significant rise of Rashtriya Janata Dal (RJD) led by Yadav. The RJD successfully attracted the Koeri and Yadav leadership of the party, thus strengthening itself at the cost of liberation.

Combination of political and non-political conflicts

The society of Bihar was divided into OBCs, SCs and Forward Castes (upper caste); the forward castes had dominated the democratic institutions of the state in the rule of Congress  and only a section of OBCs were politically conscious to think of replacing them from political power, this section, which included only three caste (Koeri, Kurmi and Yadav) also owned land in other parts of Bihar, but was poor in the areas dominated of the forward castes. They took land on tenancy from the forward castes, as they were marginal farmers in these areas. A fair number of the OBCs were also employed in the state institutions and were among educated servicemen in the urban areas. They remained victims of the high handedness of the upper-caste colleagues and the rivalry between them was evolving over time.

In rural areas, the OBCs were also confronting the MBC or Extremely Backward Class (also called Most Backward Castes, the category which includes more than hundred Backward Castes, other than trio of Koeri, Kurmi and Yadav) and the Scheduled Castes, but the upper-castes treated all sections of Backward Castes in the same manner, causing much resentment among the elite section of the Backwards. In the rural areas, the upper-castes countered the Most Backward Classes and Schedule Castes, when they wanted to eschew the village based livelihood options. They [upper-castes] reacted violently, when the MBC or the SCs tried to detach from any social institutions, that were symbol of low caste status. Since for different reasons, the OBCs, MBCs and the SCs were all pitted against the common rivals, the upper-castes, and the bitterness between the OBCs and the forward castes had strengthened after the anti-reservation protest launched by the upper-castes, unification of these social groups took place against the forward castes.

The rise of Lalu Prasad Yadav provided an opportunity to unite all these social groups and the Naxalite groups, which had many OBCs in the leadership positions, also supported the political party led by Yadav. Maoist Communist Centre of India, one of the most significant Naxalite group also sided with the interest of OBCs, and the MCC activists started providing armed backing to the Most Backward Classes and the Schedule Castes to exercise their franchise in order to led the candidates of Yadav's party towards victory. Hence, for a while, the boundary between political and Naxalite movement got blurred.

According to Professor Shashi Bhushan Singh, Department of Sociology, Delhi School of Economics, since the numerical strength of upper-caste (approximately 20% of state's population) was not enough to have large number of MLAs in the state legislature in order to control the Backward Castes, they resorted to undemocratic practices in order to retain the power in their hand, leading to rise of militancy among a section of Backwards.

According to Singh, when Lalu Prasad Yadav asked for support from the members of Backward Castes, he was actually asking it in order to change the entire social order, in which upper caste were at advantage. The reservation policy introduced by the implementation of Mandal Commission recommendations though didn't benefitted the Scheduled Castes, yet they supported Yadav against the forward castes.

According to a Social Scientist, who witnessed the encounter of Yadav with a person from the Musahar caste in North India, during his election campaign for 2000 Bihar Assembly elections, Yadav allegedly argued with latter, when he asked him to provide road infrastructure in the region. As per narrative, Yadav believed that the investment by state in physical infrastructure were somehow meant for benefitting the upper castes, who were having significant presence at the higher level of bureaucracy and in professional services. Hence, he blatantly created disruption in the general process of development, untill the Upper Backward Castes take over the Forward Castes in these services. A majority of the District Magistrates during his tenure were from the Upper Backward Castes, and he also tried to ensure that the administrative posts at the middle level, for the rank of Sub Divisional Magistrates (SDM) and Block Development Officer (BDO) were also filled by these caste group only. For the professional services like Doctors and Engineers too, same formula was implemented.

According to author Arun Sinha, though Yadav and his colleague and successor Nitish Kumar belonged to same political roots, in the matter of quota politics and the poltics of social justice for the deprived section of society, Kumar was accepted to upper castes. One reason behind this was step taken by Kumar for exclusion of well off section of the Backward Castes from the benefits of reservation in government jobs and other state sponsored program for social upliftment. In contrast to Kumar, Yadav has been described by Sinha, and was perceived as a staunch anti-upper caste leader.

Corruption and conviction

Corruption cases
Lalu Prasad Yadav has been convicted and jailed in two scams. As of January 2018, he, his wife Rabri Devi, his sons Tejashwi Yadav and Tej Pratap Yadav, and his eldest daughter Misa Bharti were all facing charges in several other corruption cases.

1996 Fodder Scam – 1st case 

Yadav was an accused party and later convicted in the first Fodder Scam case of 1996. The case involved the siphoning off of about ₹4.50 billion ($111.85 million) from the animal husbandry department.

Several allegations of embezzlement from the animal husbandry department were tabled between 1990 and 1995. In January 1996, a raid conducted on Chaibasa treasury indicated the siphoning off of funds by non-existent companies. Yadav ordered an inquiry to probe the irregularities. However, after a public interest litigation, the Bihar High Court in March 1996 ordered the case to be handed over to the CBI. In June 1997, the CBI filed the charge sheet in the case and made Yadav an accused. The charge forced Yadav to resign from the office of Chief Minister, at which time he appointed his wife, Rabri Devi, to the office.

In 2001, the Supreme Court of India transferred the scam cases to newly formed court in Ranchi, Jharkhand. The trial began in 2002. In August 2013, Yadav tried to get the trial court judge transferred, but his plea was rejected by Supreme Court of India. Yadav has been an accused in many of the 53-odd cases filed. He has been remanded to custody on multiple occasions because of the number of cases. Over 64 people were convicted in the case. Yadav was first sent to "Judicial remand" (Bihar Military Police guest house, Patna) on 30 July 1997, for 134 days. On 28 October 1998, he was again sent to the same guest house for 73 days. When the Supreme Court took exception to his guest house stay, he had also moved to the Beur jail in Patna. On 26 November 2001, Yadav was again remanded, in a case related to the fodder scam. Yadav accused the NDA of creating a conspiracy against him. On 1 October 2004, the Supreme Court served a notice to Yadav and his wife in response to a petition which alleged that they have been interfering with the investigation.

Yadav, along with 44 other accused, was convicted on 30 September 2013 after being found guilty in fraudulent withdrawal of ₹37 crores (₹370 million) from Chaibasa treasury. Several other politicians, IAS officers were also convicted in the case. Immediately after the verdict was pronounced, Yadav was arrested and taken to Birsa Munda Central Jail, located at Ranchi. Yadav was disqualified as MP for six years. He was given a jail sentence of five years and a fine of ₹25 lakh (₹2.5 million).

He was released on bail from Birsa Munda Central Jail, after he completed the bail formalities in a Special CBI court,  months after his conviction.

1998 disproportionate assets case
In 1998, a disproportionate assets (DA) case arising out of the fodder scam was registered against Yadav and Rabri Devi. In April 2000, both were made co-accused in the charge-sheet and surrendered. While Rabri Devi got bail due to being Chief Minister of Bihar, Yadav was remanded in Beur jail for 11 days. They were acquitted in 2006. The Bihar government wanted to appeal against the acquittal but the Supreme Court in 2010 ruled that the state government can not challenge such rulings.

1996 Fodder Scam – 2nd case 
Yadav was convicted and jailed in the second Fodder Scam case of ₹8.927 million on the same day 23 December 2017 when his daughter Misa Bharti was also charged by the Enforcement Directorate of having disproportionate assets. Yadav was convicted 23 December 2017 and sentenced on 6 January 2018 to 3 years' imprisonment and ₹1,000,000 fine) for the fraudulent withdrawal of ₹8,900,000 from the Deoghar district treasury between 1990 and 1994.

1996 Fodder Scam – 3rd case 
This case, pertaining to scamming ₹356.2 million scammed from the Chaibasa tresury of West Singhbhum district,

1996 Fodder Scam – 4th case 
Yadav was convicted by the special CBI court in the fourth fodder scam case relating to alleged withdrawal of ₹3.13 crore from the Dumka district treasury over two decades ago. CBI Judge awarded him two separate sentences of seven years each under the Indian Penal Code (IPC) and the Prevention of Corruption Acts.

1996 Fodder Scam – 5th case 
This case, pertaining to the scamming 
Yadav has been found guilty of illegal withdrawals of ₹139.35 crore from the Doranda treasury by a special CBI court in Jharkhand's Ranchi on 15 February 2022. In February 2022 A CBI court sentenced to five years jail term in fifth case and imposed a fine of ₹60 lakh.

2005 Indian Railway tender scam

2005 Indian Railway tender scam, investigated by the CBI, is the bribery and corruption case where Lalu Prasad Yadav and his family are charged for illegally receiving prime property from the bidder as a bribe for corruptly awarding the Railway tender during Yadav's tenure as Railway Minister. Transfer of these properties as bribe to Yadav and his children were disguised using the shell companies; for example, wife Rabri Devi and three children, Misa Bharti, Tejashwi Yadav and Tej Pratap Yadav, received Saguna Mor Mall property worth ₹45 crore through a shell company named Delight Marketing (renamed as Lara properties), and another shell company AB Exports was used to transfer properties worth ₹40 crore for a price of ₹4 lakh to Lalu's other three children Tejashwi Yadav, Ragini and Chanda. This case spawned several other related but independent cases, such as disproportionate assets case as well as tax avoidance case by ED. Under the Benami Transactions Prohibition Act recipient of such benami properties can be imprisoned for up to 7 years and fined up to 25% fair market value, and convicted politicians are barred from contesting elections or holding elected position for six years.

2017 Delight Properties case

Investigated by the Enforcement Directorate (ED), against Yadav, his wife, son Tejashwi, daughter Misa and others, arose from the alleged illegal proceeds of the 2005 Indian Railway tender scam. The I-T department issued summons for 12 June 2017 to Misa Bharti, over Benami land deals worth ₹10 billion (₹1,000 crores). Misa was officially charged by ED in disproportionate assets case on the same day her father was convicted again in the second fodder scam. After the CBI lodged an FIR on 5 July 2017, ED filed the Case Information Report (ECIR) on 27 July 2017 against Lalu, his wife Rabri, their younger son Tejashwi Prasad Yadav and others in the railways tender corruption and ill-gotten property scam that happened during Lalu's tenure as the Railway Minister. Taking action against this scam, ED of Income Tax Department on 12 September 2017 attached more than 12 properties in Patna and Delhi including the plot for the mall in Patna, a farm house in Delhi and up-market land in Palam Vihar in Delhi. This includes the transfer of ₹450 million (₹45 crore) Seguna mor benami property transferred to Lalu's wife Rabri Devi and children Tejashwi Yadav and Tej Pratap Yadav by using a shell company named Delight Properties, which was later renamed as Lara Properties. (Updated: 7 Jan 2018)

2017 AB Exports cases 
AB Exports was a shell company used to transfer, as a bribe for the railway tender scam, ₹400 million (₹40 crore) benami property for a mere price of ₹400,000 to Lalu's 3 children Tejashwi Yadav, Ragini Yadav and Chanda Singh. ED has attached this property and booked the 3 accused children of Lalu. (Updated: 7 Jan 2018)

2017 Patna zoo soil scam

2017 Patna zoo soil scam is an allegation/case against Lalu Prasad Yadav and his sons Tej Pratap Yadav and Tejashwi Yadav for the "gross irregularities" of selling soil from the construction of Tej Pratap's Saguna Mor mall basement. The bogus beautification scheme was for ₹90 lakh to Patna zoo without inviting any tenders when Tej Pratap was the minister of environment and forest in Bihar, a department that controls the zoo. The scam came to the light in April 2017, a public interest litigation (PIL) was filed in Patna High Court in October 2017, court ordered the Bihar government to furnish the details of investigation, following which the case was handed over to Bihar Vigilance Investigation Bureau (VIB) department for the investigation under the Pollution Control Board Act, the Environment Protection Act and Wildlife Protection Act (1972) (update: 6 Jan 2018).

The Bihar government said that official procedure was duly followed in the case and prima facie no evidence of irregularity has come into light in zoo soil deal. (Updated: 31 May 2020)

Bail
Yadav was convicted in the controversial Fodder Scam, and was serving a term until 17 April 2021, when he was granted bail from the Jharkhand High Court in the corruption scandal.

Criticism

Corruption, nepotism and dynasticism 
Yadav is one of the first noted politicians to lose parliamentary seat on being arrested in fodder scam as per Supreme Court decision banning convicted legislators to hold their posts.  During his tenure as Chief Minister, Bihar's law and order was at lowest, kidnapping was on rise and private armies mushroomed. He was also criticized  by opposition in the Shilpi-Gautam Murder case and the death of his daughter Ragini Yadav's friend, Abhishek Mishra, in mysterious circumstances.

Criticism on Yadavisation
Lalu Yadav's rule witnessed Yadav caste becoming assertive in the rural and urban landscape of Bihar, leading his opponents to coin the slogan of "Yadavisation" of Bihar's polity and administration. This fact was used by other political parties to dislodge his government on the charges of working for the benefit of a single caste group at the cost of various other backward communities. According to a report of Indian Human Development Survey (2011–12), Brahmins topped in average per capita income with ₹28,093, the other upper castes of Bihar which comprises Rajputs have an average per capita income of ₹20,655, closely followed by middle agrarian castes like Kushwahas and Kurmis earning ₹18,811 and ₹17,835 respectively as their average per capita income. In contrast, Yadavs’ income is one of the lowest among OBCs at ₹12,314, which is slightly less than the rest of OBCs (₹12,617). Hence; despite the political mobilisation of backward castes in post mandal period, the upper-caste are still the highest income groups in Bihar. According to this report, the economic benefits of the Mandal politics could be seen as affecting only few backward castes of agrarian background leading to their upward mobilisation. The Yadavs hence transformed their assertiveness to the upward mobility in the politics only while the other "Backward Castes" gained momentum in the other fields, though still the upper-caste dominance was retained in upper echelon of bureaucracy.

Writings 
Lalu Prasad has written his autobiography named Gopalganj to Raisina Road.

Filmography 

 Padmashree Laloo Prasad Yadav (Bollywood), as himself (special appearance)
 Mahua (Bhojiwood)
 Gudri Ke Lal (Bhojiwood)

In media

Books 
A writer named Neena Jha has written a book on Lalu Prasad named Lalu Prasad, India's miracle.
Book named Laloo Prasad Yadav: A Charismatic Leader was published in 1996.
"The Making of Laloo Yadav, The Unmaking of Bihar", updated and reprinted under the title "Subaltern Sahib: Bihar and the Making of Laloo Yadav", is a book based on Lalu's life by Sankarshan Thakur.

Movies 

 Padmashree Laloo Prasad Yadav, the Bollywood movie was released in 2005. It was based on a girl named Padmshree, her boyfriend Laloo, her lawyer Prasad and Yadav was Lalu Prasad himself as a special appearance.
Upcoming Bhojpuri film Lalten is a biopic based on the life of Lalu Prasad.

See also
List of politicians from Bihar
History of Backward Caste movement in Bihar

References

External links 

 

|-

|-

|-

|-

Criminals from Bihar
Indian politicians convicted of crimes
Indian politicians convicted of corruption
Indian politicians disqualified from office
Chief Ministers of Bihar
Finance Ministers of Bihar
Railway Ministers of India
India MPs 1977–1979
India MPs 1989–1991
India MPs 1998–1999
India MPs 2004–2009
India MPs 2009–2014
Rajya Sabha members from Bihar
Leaders of the Opposition in the Bihar Legislative Assembly
Indian socialists
Janata Party (Secular) politicians
Lok Dal politicians
Janata Dal politicians
Janata Party politicians
Chief ministers from Janata Dal
Rashtriya Janata Dal politicians
Indian political party founders
Indians imprisoned during the Emergency (India)
V. P. Singh administration
Lalu Prasad
Indian Hindus
Living people
1947 births
Bihari politicians
Members of the Bihar Legislative Assembly